John Payne Ltd was a shipbuilder in Bristol, England, who built coastal colliers and cargo ships, and small craft such as tugs, during the 19th and 20th centuries.

History

Origins
In around 1850, John Payne established himself as a millwright, engineer, iron founder and steam boiler maker, inland from the River Avon at Tower Hill in Bristol. In 1859, he branched out into shipbuilding, a natural expansion of his marine business, firstly completing the Jane, a small wooden steam tug. This had to be launched into Bristol Harbour after transportation by truck, and she was used by the company to tow barges with machinery from the wharf near the workshops. Her small size once enabled her to save the crew of a stricken barque in Bristol Harbour. The company built three wooden tugs at Tower Hill, likely including the diminutive 11 t Merrimac, and later built up the towing fleet over a number of years.

Expansion
Following some initial success with wooden-hulled tugs, in 1862 John Payne acquired the former Acraman Yard in Bedminster in order to build iron vessels. A number of these ships were fitted with steam engines built in his own foundry in Tower Hill. The first iron tug was the Emma of 1862, and several new construction orders followed for several iron-hulled vessels for local operators. In 1864 the company moved away from the traditional tug building business and built the first coastal collier, the Isca a sloop-rigged steamer of 65 t.

Having built in iron for some years, an experimental composite-hulled design was built in 1865, the  Cardiff Castle, a paddle steamer tug of 62 t, later converted to a yacht in 1880 with an unusual dandy rig and wrecked on Cardiff Grounds on 15 April 1897. The same year the Kate was completed, and these were the first paddle vessels built at the Acraman's Yard by John Payne. The Kate was a double-ended design which later operated from Penarth beach.

The Harlequin of 1868 was the first tug design with twin screws, which provided superior towage control and had advanced engine arrangements for their day. The same year, John Payne completed two river steamers for Brazil, the Corruipe and Mondahu, steel twin-screw vessels of 200 t and the largest vessels yet built by the yard. These appear to have been the companies only exports. The steamer Henry Allen, completed in 1874, was even larger at 225t.

A new chairman
In 1880, John Payne Snr. died, and his son also called John took over the running of the firm. By the close of the decade the first steel-hulled vessel was built, the steamer Teal of 131 t and launched in 1889, although the company continued to also build in iron until 1893. Under John Payne Jnr.'s leadership the company continued to build a steady stream of cargo ships, tugs and a barge Bristol Safe, later rebuilt in 1912 to be the 129 t twin-screw ketch-rigged steamer Garthavon.

Lean years
Things changed in 1910 when John Payne Jnr. died, leaving the company to be run by Mrs. Amelia Payne, who set up a limited company as John Payne Ltd, to run both the shipyard and towage business. The tug Bristol Scout was the only order before World War I, when three of the company's tugs were requisitioned by the Port Examination Service, with the larger John Payne seeing service in the Dardanelles in Turkey. 
A large tug of 134t was ordered by the Admiralty late in the war, and was completed after the armistice as the West Winch and bought by the company. Both the John Payne and West Winch were later sold to C.J. Kings, who operated a fleet of tugs from Avonmouth.

James Towers Shipbuilding Company
With new orders in the early 1920s for two large coasting vessels, the company was sold to new owners James Towers Shipbuilding Co. in 1924. These vessels, the largest built by John Payne, were completed that year, with the Reedham being the largest at 483 t. The steel cargo ships were later sold to Coast Lines Ltd. and the other to an operator in Canada.

Unfortunately the new owners joined the industry at the wrong time, as the post-war depression hit the area quite badly, and in 1925 the yard closed itself to shipbuilding, and was reopened by Harry Payne as the factory for Bristol Metal Spraying and Welding Company.

John Payne built vessels

The company built more than 40 vessels. Known ships include:

Coastal colliers and cargo ships
Isca (1864), 65t iron steam screw sloop
Enid (1867), 88t iron steam screw sloop
Monmouth (1869), 65t iron steam screw sloop
Ethel (1870), 100t iron steam screw sloop
Pendragon (1870), 59t iron steam screw sloop
Henry Allen (1874), 225t iron steam twin-screw schooner
Ibis (1881), 169t iron steam schooner
Teal (1889), 131t steel steam screw ketch 
Reedham (1924), 483t steel screw steamer
Smitham (1924), 447t steel screw steamer

River steamers
Corruipe (1868), 200t iron twin-screw river steamer
Mondahu (1868), 200t iron twin-screw river steamer

Coastal and harbour tugs
Jane (1859), 27t wooden steam screw tug
Emma (1862), 22t iron steam screw tug
Kate (1865), 30t iron steam paddle sloop-rigged tug
Cardiff Castle (1865), 62t composite steam paddle dandy-rigged tug
Dolphin (1866), 42t iron steam screw tug
Harlequin (1868), 58t iron steam twin-screw tug
Leo (1871), 95t iron steam paddle tug
Merlin (1871), 19t iron steam paddle tug
Oberon (1871), 56t iron steam screw sloop-rigged tug
Queen Mab (1872), 48t iron steam screw tug
Star (1875), 40t wooden steam screw tug
Oberon (1876), 56t iron steam twin-screw tug
Elf (1876), 53t wooden steam screw tug
Kimberley (1878), 54t iron steam screw tug
Fawn (1878), 29t iron steam screw tug
Stag (1883), 41t iron steam screw tug
Columbine (1886), 60t iron steam screw tug
Staghound (1892), 39t iron steam screw tug
Antelope (1893), 36t iron steam screw tug
Brunel (1895), 36t steel steam screw tug
Cabot (1899), 61t steel steam screw tug
Gazelle (1901), 57t steel steam screw tug
Contract (1907), 38t steel steam screw tug
John Payne (1909), 145t steel steam screw tug
Bristol Scout (1911), 54t steel steam screw tug
West Winch (1920), 134t steel steam screw tug

Barges
Bristol Safe (1904), 106t steel barge

References

Defunct shipbuilding companies of the United Kingdom
British companies established in 1859
Manufacturing companies established in 1859
Defunct companies based in Bristol
1859 establishments in England